The Acropolis International Tournament 2006 was a basketball tournament held in OAKA Indoor Hall in Athens, Greece, from July 31 until August 2, 2006. This was the 20th edition of the Acropolis International Basketball Tournament. The four participating teams were Greece, France, Croatia and Italy.

Venues

Participating teams

Standings 

|-bgcolor="gold"

|}

Results

Final standings

Statistics 
First Day:

Day 1:

Greece beat Croatia 79-54

19-12, 44-25, 59-37, 79-54.

Greece (21/34 FT, 23/34 (2-p), 4/16 (3-p), 35 rebs, 13 errors, 17 assists, 10 steals, 2 blocks): Kakiouzis 10, Tsartsaris 9(2), Papaloukas 7, Fotsis 8, Hatzivrettas 2, Dikoudis 8 (1), Papadopoulos 16, Diamantidis 3(1), Zisis 4, Mavrokefalidis 2, Spanoulis 4, Vasilopoulos 6.

Croatia (10/16 (FT), 13/34 (2-P), 6/20 (3-P), 30 rebs, 19 errors, 11 assists, 6 steals, 1 block): Ukic 4, Kus 2, Planinic 11(1), Miljkovic 10(2), Tomas 3(1), Longin 2, Prkacin 2, Kasun 10, Markota 2, Vrbac 10(2).

France beat Italy 66-59.

22-16, 36-25, 58-47, 66-59.

France: Gomi 3, Gelebale, Zaneau 5 (1), Fuare, M. Pietrus 11, Parker 23 (1), Diara 5 (1), Pietrus 5, Julian, Diope 2, Petreau 4, Wais 8.

Italy: Di Bella 3 (1), Basile 6 (1), Mancinelli 1, Soragna 2, Marconato 2, Belinelli 14 (3), Pecile 6, Michelori, Guliomaria 4, Mordente 4, Dari 6, Gili 11.

2nd Day:

Greece beat Italy 70-63

18-8, 29-29, 47-46, 70-63.

Greece (15/27 FT's, 23/37 (2-p), 3/10 (3-p), 32 rebs, 19 errors, 12 assist, 9 steals, 3 blocks): Papaloukas 12(1), Kiritsis, Schortsianitis, Spanoulis 7(1), Vasilopoulos, Fotsis 14(2), Hatzivrettas 8, Dikoudis 4, Tsartsaris, Diamantidis 17, Papadopoulos 8, Papamakarios.

Italy (15/27 FT's, 23/37 (2-p), 3/10 (3-p), 29 rebs, 15 errors, 12 assists, 7 steals, 1 blocks): Giaketti 5, Basile 4, Mancinelli 9(1), Soragna 3, Belinelli, Roccha 20, Pecile, Michelori 8, Citantini, Mordende 8(2), Garri 2, Gilliι 4(1).

France beats Croatia 76-69

21-19, 49-31, 58-52,

France: Gomis 5 (1), Gelabale, Bokolo 4, Fuare, M. Pietrus 6, Parker 13, Diara, F. Pietrus 7 (1), Julian 6, Diope 10 (1), Petro 13, Touriaf 12.

Croatia: Ukic 9, Kus 7 (2), Milikovic, Prkacin 4, Tomas 7 (1), Planinic 8, Pasalic, Vrbac 3 (1), Banic 13, Kasun 13, Markota 5 (1).

3rd Day:

Greece - France 70:56

Greece: Spanoulis 11pts (3ast), Fotsis 10pts (4ast), Diamantidis 9pts (4rbds, 4st), Kakiouzis 9pts (4rbds), Schortsianitis 8pts (3st), Papadopoulos 6pts (4 TO, 2bs), Chatzivrettas 6pts, Zisis 6pts (4ast), Dikoudis 4pts (4rbds, 4ast), Tsartsaris 1pt, Papamakarios, Vasilopoulos

France: Parker 20pts (7 TO, 5ast), Diaw 8pts (6rbds, 5 TO), Gelabale 8pts (6rbds), Pietrus 5pts (4rbds), Foirest 5pts, Julian 4pts (3ast), Weis 2pts, Turiaf, Bokolo, Diarra, Jeanneau

Italy - Croatia 69:73

Italy: Di Bella 13pts (5ast), Mordente 12pts (3st), Soragna 9pts (3ast), Basile 9pts, Pecile 8pts, Rocca 7pts, Michelori 7pts, Marconato 4pts (5rbds), Mancinelli, Gigli, Boscagin, Cittadini

Croatia: Kasun 18pts (6rbds), Planinic 17pts (8rbds, 4ast), Ukic 11pts (4ast), Miljkovic 6pts, Longin 6pts (5rbds), Tomas 5pts, Pasalic 4pts (7rbds), Banic 4pts, Markota 2pts (5rbds, 5 TO), Kus, Prkacin, Vrbanc

References

External links
Basket.gr Acropolis Cup History Search Results 
Acropolis Cup 2006 Results

Acropolis International Basketball Tournament
2005–06 in Greek basketball
2005–06 in Croatian basketball
2005–06 in Italian basketball